PDM Racing was a racing team in the IndyCar Series and USAC Silver Crown series owned by Paul Diatlovich. Almost always a low budget team and affectionately (or unaffectionately) dubbed "Poor Dumb Mechanics" by one of its former owners, it is known to make the most out of mediocre equipment. The team was founded in 1996 with the inception of the Indy Racing League and ran full seasons until 2002 when rising costs forced the team to scale back to a part-time venture. The team is most known for bringing three-time champion Sam Hornish Jr. into the league in 2000. Hornish earned the team's best finish that season, a 3rd at Las Vegas Motor Speedway.

The team fielded a USAC Silver Crown team with its car driven by Thiago Medeiros whom they also fielded a car for in the 2006 Indianapolis 500. The team entered the 2007 Indianapolis 500 with driver Jimmy Kite returning to the team, but they were unable to come within  of the speed necessary to make the field and failed to qualify.
During the 2008 season the team partnered with American Spirit Racing to field Cyndie Allemann in the Firestone Indy Lights Series providing technical support and a base of operations. PDM Racing entered the Indy 500 but did not make an appearance. PDM Racing continued working with ASR to field the Indy Lights car driven by Junior Strous until the Freedom 100 when the program folded. The team has returned to Indy Lights in 2010 under its own banner with driver Rodrigo Barbosa.

Drivers that have driven for PDM

IRL IndyCar Series
 Billy Boat (1997)
 Mike Borkowski (1999)
 Tyce Carlson (1997–1998, 2002)
 Ed Carpenter (2003)
 John de Vries (2002)
 Mark Dismore (1997)
 Jack Hewitt (1998)
 Sam Hornish Jr. (2000)
 Jimmy Kite (2003)
 Steve Knapp (1998–1999)
 Cory Kruseman (2002)
 Scott Mayer (2003)
 Robby McGehee (2004)
 Thiago Medeiros (2006)
 John Paul Jr. (1996–1998)
 Eliseo Salazar (1998)
 Jeret Schroeder (2001–2002)

Indy Lights
 Cyndie Allemann (2008)
 Rodrigo Barbosa (2010)
 Junior Strous (2009)

Complete IRL IndyCar Series results
(key) (Results in bold indicate pole position; results in italics indicate fastest lap)

 The 1999 VisionAire 500K at Charlotte was cancelled after 79 laps due to spectator fatalities.

Sources

External links
Official PDM Racing website

IndyCar Series teams
American auto racing teams
Indy Lights teams